Joey Stec (born 1947) is an American songwriter, singer, guitarist, producer and president of Sonic Past Music.

Biography 

In 1967, he became a member of the Millennium. In 1969 he joined The Blues Magoos, and formed The Dependables. In 1976, he released a solo album on Playboy Records, produced by Rolling Stones producer Jimmy Miller.

While Stec doesn't have name recognition, he worked with well-known artists.

Joey Stec founded Sonic Past Music in 2000, a record label focusing on previously unreleased work by classic rock artists.

References

External links 
 Sonic Past Music
 [ Joey Stec] at Allmusic

Living people
American rock guitarists
American male guitarists
Place of birth missing (living people)
Playboy Records artists
1947 births